Kyara Stijns (born 9 October 1995) is a Dutch professional racing cyclist. She started cycling with club team 'WCL Bergklimmers' in the south of the province of Limburg. In 2013, she won the Dutch junior national championships road race. As a result, she became pro riding for Giant-Shimano in 2014. On Friday 31 July 2015 she became third in the Profronde Heerlen, after winner Chantal Blaak and second Anna van der Breggen. On Sunday 6 September 2015 she started the last stage of the Holland Ladies Tour in her hometown Bunde. In the same month the team announced Stijns will also be riding for Liv-Plantur in 2016.

Major results
2013
 Dutch road champion (junior)

See also
 2014 Team Giant-Shimano season
 2015 Team Liv-Plantur season

References

External links
 

1995 births
Living people
Dutch female cyclists
People from Bunde
Cyclists from Limburg (Netherlands)
21st-century Dutch women